Albert Vickers Bryan Jr. (November 8, 1926 – August 27, 2019) was a United States district judge of the United States District Court for the Eastern District of Virginia.

Education and career

Born in Alexandria, Virginia, Bryan's father Albert Vickers Bryan, was also a federal judge. The Albert V. Bryan United States Courthouse, in Alexandria, is named for his father. The younger Bryan served in the United States Marine Corps reserve from 1944 to 1946, and then received a Bachelor of Laws from the University of Virginia School of Law in 1950. He was in private practice of law in Alexandria from 1950 to 1962. He was a judge of the 16th Judicial Circuit of Virginia from 1962 to 1971.

Federal judicial service

Bryan was nominated by President Richard Nixon on July 19, 1971, to a new seat on the United States District Court for the Eastern District of Virginia created by 84 Stat. 294. He was confirmed by the United States Senate on July 29, 1971, and received his commission the same day. He served as Chief Judge from 1985 until December 1, 1991, when he assumed senior status.  His service terminated on August 27, 2019, due to his death of pneumonia in Alexandria.

In 1979, Bryan was selected by Chief Justice Warren Burger as one of the seven original members of the Foreign Intelligence Surveillance Court, and he served on that court until 1986.

Rocket docket
While serving as a federal judge, Bryan decided that justice was being dispensed too slowly for his liking, and as a result he ran a rocket docket.

Notable cases
 United States v. LaRouche (1988)
 French Quarter Cafe v. Virginia Alcoholic Beverage Control Board (1991)
 Harvey v. Horan (2001)

See also
 List of United States federal judges by longevity of service

References

Sources
 
  Political Graveyard

1926 births
2019 deaths
Lawyers from Alexandria, Virginia
Military personnel from Alexandria, Virginia
Judges of the United States District Court for the Eastern District of Virginia
United States district court judges appointed by Richard Nixon
20th-century American judges
University of Virginia School of Law alumni
Deaths from pneumonia in Virginia
United States Marine Corps personnel of World War II
United States Marine Corps reservists
Virginia circuit court judges
Judges of the United States Foreign Intelligence Surveillance Court